Feature Story News (FSN) is an international broadcast news agency providing news coverage, live reports and news packages to television and radio stations around the world. FSN was founded in 1992 by former ITN reporter Simon Marks. Its headquarters are at 1730 Rhode Island Avenue in Washington D.C.

Bureaus 
FSN has bureaus around the world, most of which have a live TV studio as part of the setup.

North America 
Washington, D.C.; Manhattan (E 48th Street); United Nations Headquarters; San Francisco; Houston; Denver; Los Angeles; and Miami

Latin America 
Caracas, Havana, Mexico City and San Salvador

Europe 
Berlin, Brussels, London, Moscow and Paris

Africa 
Abuja, Accra, Addis Ababa, Cape Town, Dar es Salam, Juba, Kampala, and Kinshasa

Asia 
Bangkok, Beijing,  Delhi, Hong Kong, Mumbai, Tokyo and Seoul

Clients

Television 
Television clients of FSN include: PBS NewsHour (USA), Channel 4 News (UK), Good Morning Britain (UK), ITN News (UK), Channel News Asia (Singapore), TV3 (New Zealand), Fox News Channel (USA), CGTN (China), WION (TV channel) and Al Jazeera.

Radio 
FSN generates numerous radio bulletins throughout the day for paying clients. At weekends, a Week In Review bulletin is produced. Bulletins are 30 seconds, 3 minutes, or 5 minutes long and are distributed along with news cuts and packages via FTP.

A number of broadcasters use FSN correspondents and reports as part of their own news output.

FSN radio clients include Vatican Radio, DW Radio, RTÉ, SABC, Radio New Zealand, and Radio France International. The AIR News radio news agency uses FSN audio and broadcasts FSN bulletins during overnight hours.

References

External links
 Feature Story News
 Simon Marks

News agencies based in the United States
Mass media companies based in Washington, D.C.